The Gare de Saint-Martin-du-Vivier (Saint-Martin-du-Vivier station) is a railway station located in the commune of Saint-Martin-du-Vivier in the Seine-Maritime department, France.  It was served by TER Normandie and TER Hauts-de-France trains from Amiens to Rouen until summer 2019.

References

Defunct railway stations in Seine-Maritime